Sarot is a town in the Sarot second-order division of the Castries District of the island nation of Saint Lucia. The Sarot division has a population of 690.  Sarot is located towards the heart of the island, between Vanard and Durandeau and close to Morne Ciseaux and La Treille.

See also
List of cities in Saint Lucia
Castries District

References

Towns in Saint Lucia